Roman Jůn (born 5 January 1976 in Czech Republic) is a retired Czech football midfielder. During his career, Jun has played for Pardubice, Bohemians 1905, FK Mladá Boleslav, Slovan Liberec, České Budějovice and Hradec Králové.

Honours
 Slovan Liberec
Czech Cup: 1999–2000

References

External links
 

1976 births
Living people
Czech footballers
Bohemians 1905 players
FK Mladá Boleslav players
FC Slovan Liberec players
SK Dynamo České Budějovice players
FC Hradec Králové players
Association football midfielders